Brillat-Savarin is a soft-ripened triple cream cow's milk cheese with at least 72% fat in dry matter (roughly 40% overall). It has a natural, bloomy rind.  It was created c. 1890 as "Excelsior" or "Délice des gourmets" ("Gourmets' delight") by the Dubuc family, near Forges-les-Eaux (Seine-Maritime). Cheese-maker Henri Androuët renamed it in the 1930s, as an homage to 18th-century French gourmet and political figure Jean Anthelme Brillat-Savarin.

Brillat-Savarin is produced all year round mainly in Burgundy. It comes in  wheels and approximately 4 cm thick, and is matured for one to two weeks in dry cellar. It is also available as a fresh cheese (non affiné) that resembles rich cream cheese.

It is a triple cream soft-ripened cheese that is luscious, creamy and faintly sour.

See also
 List of French cheeses
 List of cheeses

References

Norman cuisine
French cheeses
Cow's-milk cheeses